Tathiana Garbin and Janette Husárová were the defending champions, but none competed this year. Garbin opted to play at Brussels in the same week.

Evgenia Kulikovskaya and Ekaterina Sysoeva won the title by defeating Lubomira Bacheva and Angelika Rösch 6–4, 6–3 in the final.

Seeds

Draw

Draw

References

External links
 Official results archive (WTA)
 Official results archive (ITF)

Doubles
Internazionali Femminili di Palermo - Doubles